Wendell is a city in southern Gooding County, Idaho, United States. The population was 2,782 at the 2010 census.

Geography
Wendell is located at  (42.775974, -114.702699).

Demographics

2010 census
As of the census of 2010, there were 2,782 people, 978 households, and 695 families residing in the city. The racial makeup of the city was 74.2% White, 0.2% African American, 1.4% Native American, 0.3% Asian, 0.2% Pacific Islander, 21.9% from other races, and 2.0% from two or more races. Hispanic or Latino of any race were 35.7% of the population.

There were 978 households, of which 40.7% had children under the age of 18 living with them, 53.6% were married couples living together, 10.8% had a female householder with no husband present, 6.6% had a male householder with no wife present, and 28.9% were non-families. 24.7% of all households were made up of individuals, and 14.4% had someone living alone who was 65 years of age or older. The average household size was 2.83 and the average family size was 3.37.

The median age in the city was 31.9 years. 30.6% of residents were under the age of 18; 10.2% were between the ages of 18 and 24; 25.5% were from 25 to 44; 19.7% were from 45 to 64; and 14.2% were 65 years of age or older. The gender makeup of the city was 51.1% male and 48.9% female.

2000 census
As of the census of 2000, there were 2,338 people, 835 households, and 613 families residing in the city. The racial makeup of the city was 88.92% White, 0.04% African American, 0.47% Native American, 0.21% Asian, 0.13% Pacific Islander, 7.78% from other races, and 2.44% from two or more races. Hispanic or Latino of any race were 17.54% of the population.

There were 835 households, out of which 36.8% had children under the age of 18 living with them, 58.1% were married couples living together, 12.1% had a female householder with no husband present, and 26.5% were non-families. 22.2% of all households were made up of individuals, and 10.3% had someone living alone who was 65 years of age or older. The average household size was 2.76 and the average family size was 3.23.

In the city, the population was spread out, with 30.7% under the age of 18, 9.6% from 18 to 24, 23.7% from 25 to 44, 19.5% from 45 to 64, and 16.5% who were 65 years of age or older. The median age was 33 years. For every 100 females, there were 92.1 males. For every 100 females age 18 and over, there were 91.2 males.

The median income for a household in the city was $29,390, and the median income for a family was $32,377. Males had a median income of $23,750 versus $14,375 for females. The per capita income for the city was $14,169. About 11.7% of families and 13.1% of the population were below the poverty line, including 19.9% of those under age 18 and 9.7% of those age 65 or over.

Schools
The Wendell School System includes an elementary school, a middle school, and Wendell High School. Its sports teams are nicknamed the Trojans. In 2005, Wendell Middle School was awarded the Idaho Education Award by the State of Idaho.

Notable people
 Sherry Jackson, actress
 James F. Amos, 35th Commandant of the Marine Corps

See also
 List of cities in Idaho

References

External links

 

Cities in Gooding County, Idaho
Cities in Idaho